Ghetto Supastar is the debut solo studio album by former Fugees member and American rapper Pras. The album was released on October 27, 1998, through Ruffhouse Records and Columbia Records.

Background
The album was released by Ruffhouse Records. The album debuted at number fifty-five on the US Billboard 200 chart, and number thirty-five on the R&B/Hip-Hop Albums chart. The album, which included the title track, features a rap by Ol' Dirty Bastard and additional vocals by R&B singer Mýa, became a worldwide hit, and Pras' biggest hit to date as a solo artist, reaching number fifteen on the Billboard Hot 100, and reaching number one in eight countries, as well as reaching the top five in five countries as well, including the United Kingdom. The title track received a nomination for Best Rap Performance by a Duo or Group at the 41st Grammy Awards. Originally, What'cha Wanna Do was due to be released as the album's third single on September 28, 1998. However, at the last minute, it was replaced with Blue Angels.

Track listing
 "Hallelujah" - 1.30
 "Ghetto Supastar (That Is What You Are)" (featuring Ol' Dirty Bastard & Mýa) - 4.21
 "Phone Interlude" - 2.33
 "What'cha Wanna Do" (featuring The Product & Free) - 4.11
 "Blue Angels" (featuring The Product) - 4.13
 "Can't Stop The Shining" (featuring Canibus & Free) - 4.15
 "Get Your Groove On" (featuring The Product & Most Wanted) - 4.26
 "Frowsey" - 3.18
 "Dirty Cash" - 1.35
 "For The Love Of This" - 4.07
 "Wha' What Wha' What" (featuring Most Wanted) - 3.56
 "Second Phone Interlude" (featuring Left Eye) - 2.10
 "Lowriders" (featuring The Product & Most Wanted) - 4.12
 "Yeah 'Eh Yeah 'Eh" (featuring Mack 10 & Reptile) - 3.49
 "Murder Dem" - 4.22
 "Third Phone Interlude" - 3.52
 "Amazing Grace" - 5.03
 "Final Interlude" - 3.29

 UK Bonus Tracks
 19. "Avenues" (Refugee Camp All-Stars featuring Pras)
 20. "Another One Bites The Dust" (Queen & Wyclef Jean featuring Pras & Free)

 US Deluxe Edition Bonus Disc
 "What's Clef" (Wyclef Jean)
 "The Right One" (John Forté with Pras & Jeni Fujita)
 "Another One Bites The Dust" (Queen & Wyclef Jean with Pras & Free)
 "Here We Go" (Funkmaster Flex with Khadejia, The Product, Wyclef Jean & Pras)

Production credits
Salaam Remi:  Producer
Warren Riker: Engineer, Mixing
Ol' Dirty Bastard: Performer
Mack 10:  Performer
Wyclef Jean:  Guitar, Producer, Executive Producer
Mýa: Performer
Chris Theis  Engineer, Mixing
Davis Factor  Photography
Canibus:  Performer
Pras:  Producer, Executive Producer, Main Performer
Lisa Michelle  Stylist
Jayson Dyer:  Assistant Engineer
Dawn Fitch:  Digital Imaging
Veronica Fletcher:  Hair Stylist
A Kid Called Roots:  Producer
Nancie Stern:  Sample Clearance
Mario DeArce:  Engineer
Free:  Performer
Che:  Producer
Will Quinnell:  Mastering
Rev. Richard White:  Graphic Assistant
Phil Blackman:  Engineer
Brain:  Art Direction
Lenny Kravitz:  Guitar

Samples
Ghetto Supastar (That Is What You Are)
"Get Up, Get Into It, Get Involved" by James Brown
"Islands in the Stream" by Kenny Rogers and Dolly Parton
"Under the Influence of Love" by Love Unlimited
Murder Dem
"Baby It's You" by Smith
"Murder Dem" by Ninja Man
What'cha Wanna Do
"Do You Really Want to Hurt" by Culture Club
Blue Angels
"Grease" by Frankie Valli

Charts

References

1998 debut albums
Pras albums
Ruffhouse Records albums